The 2021 UCI America Tour was the seventeenth season of the UCI America Tour. The season begins on 17 January 2021 with the Vuelta al Táchira and ended on 31 October 2021 with the last stage of the Tour Cycliste International de la Guadeloupe.

The points leader, based on the cumulative results of previous races, wears the UCI America Tour cycling jersey. Throughout the season, points are awarded to the top finishers of stages within stage races and the final general classification standings of each of the stages races and one-day events. The quality and complexity of a race also determines how many points are awarded to the top finishers, the higher the UCI rating of a race, the more points are awarded.

The UCI ratings from highest to lowest are as follows:
 Multi-day events: 2.Pro, 2.1 and 2.2
 One-day events: 1.Pro, 1.1 and 1.2

Events

2020

2021

References

External links
 

 
2021
2021 in men's road cycling
2021 in North American sport
2021 in South American sport